Moortown is a part of Brighstone on the west side of the Isle of Wight. The area is known as the Back of the Wight. Previously, the only form of public transport to pass through the village is infrequent Wightbus service 36, connecting the village with Newport and Brighstone. However, this service was discontinued by the Council in September 2011.

References

Villages on the Isle of Wight
Brighstone